Francis Edward Meehan  (1864 – 22 December 1946) was an Irish nationalist politician and Member of Parliament (MP) in the House of Commons of the United Kingdom of Great Britain and Ireland.

He was first elected as the Irish Parliamentary Party MP for the Leitrim North constituency at the North Leitrim by-election on 21 February 1908, and was again re-elected at the January 1910 and December 1910 general elections. He continued in the constituency until its abolition in 1918, and he was subsequently awarded a member of the Order of the British Empire in 1920.

His cousin Patrick Meehan was also an MP.

References

External links

1864 births
1946 deaths
Irish Parliamentary Party MPs
Members of the Parliament of the United Kingdom for County Leitrim constituencies (1801–1922)
UK MPs 1906–1910
UK MPs 1910
UK MPs 1910–1918
People from County Leitrim